The Richmond Spiders are a college football team representing the University of Richmond in Richmond, Virginia. Richmond was the NCAA Division I Football Championship Subdivision champion for the 2008 season. Richmond competes in the Colonial Athletic Association of the NCAA's Division I Football Championship Subdivision. Former University of Tennessee at Chattanooga head coach Russ Huesman was named head coach of the Spiders, on December 14, 2016, replacing Danny Rocco who had departed to become head coach at the University of Delaware a day earlier.

In 2008, No. 7 Richmond beat Eastern Kentucky, Appalachian State, and Northern Iowa to advance to the NCAA Division I Football Championship against Montana. In the FCS National Championship Game on December 19, 2008, they defeated Montana 24–7 to win the first team NCAA national title for the University of Richmond in any sport.
  
Richmond's traditional rival in many sports is the College of William & Mary. Richmond and William & Mary have met 133 times since 1898, making the rivalry (sometimes referred to as "the South's oldest rivalry") the fourth most-played in Division I college football. Only Lafayette–Lehigh, Princeton–Yale, and Harvard–Yale have played more games. The winner of the annual W&M–Richmond match-up claims the Capital Cup (formerly the I-64 Trophy), which reflects the historical significance of the cities of Williamsburg and Richmond as the last two capitals of the Commonwealth of Virginia.

Conference affiliations 
1881–1900: Independent
1900–1920: Eastern Virginia Intercollegiate Athletic Association (EVIAA)
1911–1921: South Atlantic Intercollegiate Athletic Association (SAIAA) – participated simultaneously as a member of both organizations
1922–1926: Independent
1927–1935: Virginia Conference
1936–1975: Southern Conference
1976–1977: NCAA Division I independent
1978–1981: NCAA Division I-A independent
1982–1985: NCAA Division I-AA independent
1986–1996: Yankee Conference
1997–2006: Atlantic 10 Conference
2007–present: Colonial Athletic Association

All-Americans
 Walker Gillette, SE- 1969 Consensus 1st Team (FWAA-1st; NEA-1st; TSN-1st; Time-1st)
 Walker Gillette, WR- 1969  (AP-1st)
 Barty Smith, RB- 1973 (AP-3rd)

Richmond Spiders in the NFL Draft

Undrafted players and non-NFL draftees
Rick Sowieta, LB, Toronto Argonauts and Ottawa Rough Riders
Carmen Cavalli, Oakland Raiders draft pick (1960)
Reggie Evans, RB
Bruce Gossett, K
Matt Joyce, G/T
Paris Lenon, LB
Matt Snider, FB
Brendan Toibin, K
Stacy Tutt, FB
Josh Vaughan, RB
Danny Desriveaux, Montreal Alouettes
Eric Ward, QB, Edmonton Eskimos (2011)
Winston October, DB/KR, Montreal Alouettes, WR/KR, Washington Redskins and Edmonton Eskimos
Ben Edwards, WR/KR, New York Giants
Seth Williams, CFL player
Martin Parker, DT
Kerry Wynn, DE
Kendall Gaskins, RB
Mike Burkhead, QB
Jacob Ruby, OL, Edmonton Eskimos
Kyle Lauletta, QB, New York Giants
Winston Craig, DT, Philadelphia Eagles
David Jones, DB

Playoffs
The Spiders have appeared in the Division I-AA/FCS Playoffs 12 times. Their combined record is 16–11. They were FCS National Champions in 2008.

Bowl games
During their time as an NCAA University Division (Major College) team, Richmond appeared in two bowl games, both times in the Tangerine Bowl against the champion of the Mid-American Conference. They have a record of 1–1.

References

External links

 

 
American football teams established in 1881
1881 establishments in Virginia